"Can't Cry Hard Enough" is a song written by David Williams and Marvin Etzioni. Williams originally recorded a version titled "I Can't Cry Hard Enough" with Victoria Williams for the latter's 1990 album Swing the Statue!. The following year, the version by both David and Andrew Williams as the Williams Brothers was released as a single. It peaked at number 42 on the US Billboard Hot 100 in early 1992. It also spent two weeks at number 29 on the Cash Box chart.

Chart history

Cover versions
 Co-writer Marvin Etzioni also recorded his own version in 1992 for his album The Mandolin Man.
 Julie Miller covered the song on her 1994 album Invisible Girl.
 Australian sibling trio the Robertson Brothers released their version as a single in 1994, from their debut album Symmetry.
 English soft rock band Smokie (with lead singer Alan Barton, who died in 1995) recorded their version which appears on their CD Celebration in 1994.
 Susan Ashton covered the song on her 1999 album Closer.
 It was also recorded by Bellefire in 2004 for their final album Spin the Wheel.
 Tom Freund recorded the song for his 2008 album Collapsible Plans, and this version appeared on the TV series One Tree Hill.
 Filipino singers Jed Madela, Sam Milby and Rachelle Ann Go have also covered the song.

References

1990 songs
1991 singles
Songs written by Marvin Etzioni
American soft rock songs
Warner Records singles